Jeannette McHugh (born 18 December 1934) is a former Australian politician who was the first woman from New South Wales elected to federal parliament. She served in the House of Representatives from 1983 to 1996, representing the Australian Labor Party (ALP), and was Minister for Consumer Affairs in the Keating Government from 1992 to 1996. She was a schoolteacher and political activist prior to entering parliament.

Early life and education
Born in Kandos, New South Wales, McHugh was educated at the University of Sydney, where she resided at the Women's College.

Career

Early career
She worked as a languages teacher and on social justice issues for many years through her involvement in housing, environment, anti-nuclear, peace and women's organisations before gaining ALP pre-selection for the Division of Phillip, a seat she won at the 1983 Australian federal election, making her the first woman from New South Wales to sit in the federal parliament.

Parliamentary career
She was made Minister for Consumer Affairs in 1992, making her the first female federal minister from New South Wales. When the Division of Phillip was abolished after an electoral redistribution, it was arranged for McHugh to move to the Division of Grayndler, as she was entitled to a seat as a minister. The sitting member Leo McLeay agreed to move to the new neighbouring electorate of Watson.

McHugh announced her retirement from parliament, to be effective at the time of the 1996 Australian federal election, at which the ALP lost government. Anthony Albanese won pre-selection for Grayndler, and retained the seat for Labor at the election. McHugh was a member of Labor's Left faction.

Post-parliamentary career
McHugh is Chair of the Jessie Street Trust, and was Secretary of the Evatt Foundation until November 2006.

Personal life
Jeannette McHugh is married to former High Court of Australia justice Michael McHugh.

Her parents were Charles Richard "Charlie" Goffet (1909–91), who taught French at Newcastle Boys High School from 1942 to 1978, and Neta Jean Goffet (née Walsh) (1909–83). Her younger sister is former Labor and Independent local councillor and Mayor of Warringah, Julie Sutton.

References

1934 births
Living people
Australian Labor Party members of the Parliament of Australia
Labor Left politicians
Members of the Australian House of Representatives for Phillip
Members of the Australian House of Representatives for Grayndler
University of Sydney alumni
Women members of the Australian House of Representatives
Women government ministers of Australia
20th-century Australian politicians
20th-century Australian women politicians